H. Berthold AG was one of the largest and most successful type foundries in the world for most of the modern typographic era, making the transition from foundry type to cold type successfully and only coming to dissolution in the digital type era.

History

H. Berthold was founded in Berlin in 1858 by Hermann Berthold, initially to make machined brass printer's rule. It then moved into casting metal type particularly after 1893. The company played a key role in the introduction of major new typefaces and was a successful player in the development of typesetting machines. The production premises were on Wilhelmstrasse No. 1 until 1868, and then on Mehringdamm 43. In 1979 the factory moved to another location between Teltow Canal and Wiesenweg in Lichterfelde.

The H. Berthold foundry's most celebrated family of typefaces is arguably Akzidenz-Grotesk (released 1898), an early sans-serif which prefigured by half a century the release of enormously popular neo-grotesque faces such as Helvetica. In 1950, type designer Günter Gerhard Lange embarked upon a long affiliation with the company, for which he designed various original typefaces, including Concorde and Imago, and oversaw the foundry's revivals of classic faces such as Garamond, Caslon, Baskerville, and Bodoni.

Cold Type

As a typefounder, Berthold had no background in producing cold type machinery until the introduction of the Diatype in 1958.

The Diatype was a relatively small desktop-sized headline-setting device (i.e. not intended for continuous justified text), based on a glass disc font master. Character selection was by means of a trigger mounted on the front of the machine (giving rise to the colloquial naming of the machine as the "duck-shooter" (in the UK at least).

When changing font, it was a notable feature of the machine that it required calibration of letter-spacing by the typing of a nonsense character sequence: "Hillimillihirtzheftpflasterentferner". Measuring the width of this 'word' at a specific font size would indicate if the character width and spacing was set correctly.

Digital Type

Diatronic
Berthold Diatronic systems were based on a glass grid master of each font weight, composed on a code-driven system. A marching-character display provided editing capabilities only to the line currently being composed.

Berthold ADS (Akzidenz Dialog System)
The next incarnation of the Diatronic system was widely adopted in the high-quality ad setting trade in Europe. Its major advantage was fine control of typography thanks to continuously variable optics, allowing fractions of point sizes to be specified.
Operator feedback was by means of a green-screen CRT display showing code mnemonics only, it being left to the operator to visualise final output.
Keyboard operation was innovative, utilizing many keys with a single legend, such as <job>, <begin>, <set>, <end>, etc. System operation was therefore effected by a combination of keys, such as <job>, then <end> to save a file.

Successor Corporations
Beset by financial troubles, H. Berthold AG ceased operations in 1993.

Berthold Types Ltd., a Chicago-based company, one of the companies which claimed to be the copyright owner of Berthold fonts, took over distribution of the Berthold digital type library and has released several new typefaces under the direction of Lange, who had retired in 1990, but served as an artistic consultant to the company until his death in 2008. Berthold Types' co-owner Harvey Hunt died in 2022, and the inventory of Berthold Types Limited (but not the legal entity) was bought by Monotype later that year.

Typefaces
These foundry types were produced by Berthold:

Cold Typefaces
These types were produced for photo-composition by Berthold:

See also
 Berthold typesetting systems

References

External links
 Berthold Types Limited– Official website
 Luc Devroye website
 Discussion about the copyright of Berthold fonts in the forum of Typophile website
 Ulrich Stiehl document discussing the copyright of Berthold fonts (in German)
 Ulrich Stiehl document in English discussing the copyright of Berthold fonts
 

Letterpress font foundries of Germany
Cold type foundries
Commercial type foundries
Manufacturing companies based in Berlin